Perin de Sasine, known by his alias Le Petit Meschin, was a French soldier, mercenary and brigand of the Hundred Years War in the 14th century.

Originally from Gascon he was a soldier in his Youth  but In 1363, after the Treaty of Brétigny, Meschin and his men began to pillage the countryside. His was one of the many so called  Tard-Venus bands, groups of mercenaries left without employment by the end of hostilities.

In early January 1362, the Tard-Venus invaded Forez and Meschin held the priory of Estivareilles.

Bourbon and Tancarville gathered their army at Brignais.

The French King's forces were besieging the town of Brignais, which had been seized by the Companies in March as an operating base. Never dreaming that the companies would dare challenge them in the open the Royal forces took few steps to secure their camp and when the companies attacked that morning of 6 April 1362 they were taken completely by surprise. In the battle that followed the government army was routed and James Bourbon and his oldest son were mortally wounded.
 

References

14th century in France
People of the Hundred Years' War
Medieval mercenaries